Events from the year 1906 in Canada.

Incumbents

Crown 
 Monarch – Edward VII

Federal government 
 Governor General – Albert Grey, 4th Earl Grey 
 Prime Minister – Wilfrid Laurier
 Chief Justice – Henri Elzéar Taschereau (Quebec) (until 2 May) then Charles Fitzpatrick (Quebec) (from 2 June)
 Parliament – 10th

Provincial governments

Lieutenant governors 
Lieutenant Governor of Alberta – George Hedley Vicars Bulyea 
Lieutenant Governor of British Columbia – Henri Joly de Lotbinière (until May 11) then James Dunsmuir 
Lieutenant Governor of Manitoba – Daniel Hunter McMillan
Lieutenant Governor of New Brunswick – Jabez Bunting Snowball 
Lieutenant Governor of Nova Scotia – Alfred Gilpin Jones (until March 15) then Duncan Cameron Fraser   
Lieutenant Governor of Ontario – William Mortimer Clark 
Lieutenant Governor of Prince Edward Island – Donald Alexander MacKinnon 
Lieutenant Governor of Quebec – Louis-Amable Jetté 
Lieutenant Governor of Saskatchewan – Amédée Forget

Premiers 
Premier of Alberta – Alexander Cameron Rutherford    
Premier of British Columbia – Richard McBride  
Premier of Manitoba – Rodmond Roblin  
Premier of New Brunswick – Lemuel John Tweedie
Premier of Nova Scotia – George Henry Murray 
Premier of Ontario – James Whitney   
Premier of Prince Edward Island – Arthur Peters 
Premier of Quebec – Lomer Gouin  
Premier of Saskatchewan – Thomas Walter Scott

Territorial governments

Commissioners 
 Commissioner of Yukon – William Wallace Burns McInnes (until December 31) then John T. Lithgow (acting)
 Commissioner of Northwest Territories – Frederick D. White

Events
 January 1 – Canada's first movie theatre Ouimetoscope opens in Montreal
 January 22 – The SS Valencia strikes a reef off Vancouver Island, killing over 100 (officially 136) in the ensuing disaster.
 March 27 – The Alpine Club of Canada is founded in Winnipeg by Elizabeth Parker and Arthur Oliver Wheeler.
 April 30 – The Ottawa Public Library opens
 May 7 – Ontario Hydro created
 May 23 – Regina decreed capital of Saskatchewan
 June 24 – Octave Crémazie Monument unveiled 
 August 26 – Edward VII grants the Coat of Arms of Saskatchewan
 The Revillon Frères trading post opens at Fort Saint John, British Columbia, as competition against the Hudson's Bay Company

Sport 
February 23 – Tommy Burns becomes the First Canadian to be Boxing's Heavyweight champion by defeating Marvin Hart

Arts and literature

Births
 January 15 – Edna Staebler, author (d. 2006)
 January 27 – Walter L. Gordon, accountant, businessman, politician and writer (d.1987)
 January 29 – Joe Primeau, ice hockey player (d.1989)
 February 14 – Roland Beaudry, politician, journalist, publicist and publisher (d.1964)
 March 10 – Lionel Bertrand, politician, journalist and newspaper editor (d.1979)
 May 15 – Robert Methven Petrie, astronomer (d.1966)
 May 16 – Alfred Pellan, painter (d.1988)
 June 22 – Stanley Fox, politician (d.1984)
 June 26 – Marian Scott, painter
 July 18 – S. I. Hayakawa, Canadian-born American academic and politician (d. 1992)
 September 24 – Leonard Marsh, social scientist and professor (d.1983)
 November 20 – John Josiah Robinette, lawyer (d.1996)
 December 16 – Barbara Kent, Canadian actress

Deaths
February 2 – Thomas Arkell, politician, farmer and grain merchant (b.1823)
March 31 – James McIntyre, poet (b.1828)
April 12 – Robert Thorburn, merchant, politician and Premier of Newfoundland (b.1836)
May 3 – Peter White, politician (b.1838)
May 19 – Gabriel Dumont, Metis leader (b.1837)
June 9 – William Carpenter Bompas, Church of England clergyman, bishop and missionary (b.1834)
June 11 – Hector-Louis Langevin, lawyer, politician and a Father of Confederation (b.1826)
October 7 – Honoré Beaugrand, journalist, politician, author and folklorist (b.1848)

Historical documents

 Reconciling Dominion Lands Act rules on homesteading and traditional Doukhobor communal practice is complicated by poverty, religious freedom and squatting.

Rugby School lecture gives somewhat fantastic and imperial picture of life in Canada for immigrant Englishman

 Hardships and success of Barr Colony settlers at Lloydminster, Saskatchewan

 British printers complain of being tricked into breaking Winnipeg strike

 Save Manitoba elk and moose from "the white man's lust for killing"

References 

 
Years of the 20th century in Canada
Canada
Canada